The Kindness of Strangers may refer to:

Plays
"I have always depended on the kindness of strangers", a line from Tennessee Williams' A Streetcar Named Desire (1947)

TV and films
"The Kindness of Strangers" (Heroes), an episode of the television show Heroes
"The Kindness of Strangers", an episode of BBC's Merlin
The Kindness of Strangers, a 1998 film by Tony Palmer about André Previn
The Kindness of Strangers a 2006 UK television film drama starring Julie Graham
The Kindness of Strangers (film), a 2019 drama film

Music
The Kindness of Strangers (album), an album by Spock's Beard
"The Kindness of Strangers", a song by Nick Cave and the Bad Seeds featured on the album Murder Ballads
"Kindness of Strangers", a song by The American Analog Set featured on the album Know by Heart

Books
The Kindness of Strangers, a 1969 memoir by Salka Viertel
The Kindness of Strangers, a 1985 biography of Tennessee Williams by Donald Spoto
The Kindness of Strangers: Child Abandonment in Western Europe from Late Antiquity to the Renaissance, a 1988 book by John Boswell
The Kindness of Strangers, a 2002 autobiography by Kate Adie
The Kindness of Strangers, a 2006 novel by Katrina Kittle
The Kindness of Strangers, a 2021 book of travel narratives by Tom Lutz

See also
The Comfort of Strangers, a 1981 novel by Ian McEwan
The Kindness Offensive, a group practicing random acts of kindness for the general public